1010 Marlene (prov. designation:  or ) is a carbonaceous background asteroid from the outer regions of the asteroid belt, approximately 47 kilometers in diameter. It was discovered on 12 November 1923, by astronomer Karl Reinmuth at the Heidelberg-Königstuhl State Observatory in southwest Germany. The asteroid was named after German actress and singer Marlene Dietrich.

Classification and orbit 

Marlene is not a member of any known asteroid family. It orbits the Sun in the outer main-belt at a distance of 2.6–3.2 AU once every 5.02 years (1,832 days). Its orbit has an eccentricity of 0.10 and an inclination of 4° with respect to the ecliptic.

The body's observation arc begins at Heidelberg in January 1924, more than two months after its official discovery observation.

Naming 

This minor planet was named after German-born Marlene Dietrich (1901–1992), actor, singer and high-profile entertainer during World War II. The name was proposed by astronomer Gustav Stracke. The official naming citation was mentioned in The Names of the Minor Planets by Paul Herget in 1955.

Physical characteristics 

Marlene is an assumed carbonaceous C-type asteroid.

Rotation period 

Most asteroids have periods shorter than 20 hours.

Another lightcurve, obtained by French amateur astronomer René Roy, gave a period of 29.0 hours and an amplitude of 0.17 magnitude.

Spin axis 

In 2013 and 2016, an international study modeled a lightcurve with a concurring period of 31.0651 and 31.066 hours, respectively. The study also determined two spin axis of (299.0°, 42.0°) and (106.0°, 47.0°) in ecliptic coordinates (λ, β).

Diameter and albedo 

According to the surveys carried out by the Infrared Astronomical Satellite IRAS, the Japanese Akari satellite and the NEOWISE mission of NASA's Wide-field Infrared Survey Explorer, Marlene measures between 43.47 and 51.085 kilometers in diameter and its surface has an albedo between 0.03 and 0.0647.

The Collaborative Asteroid Lightcurve Link derives an albedo of 0.054 and a diameter of 43.38 kilometers based on an absolute magnitude of 10.6.

Notes

References

External links 
 Asteroid Lightcurve Database (LCDB), query form (info )
 Dictionary of Minor Planet Names, Google books
 Asteroids and comets rotation curves, CdR – Observatoire de Genève, Raoul Behrend
 Discovery Circumstances: Numbered Minor Planets (1)-(5000) – Minor Planet Center
 
 

001010
Discoveries by Karl Wilhelm Reinmuth
Named minor planets
19231112